DeBrosse, de Brosse, de La Brosse, or de la Broce is a French surname. Notable people with the surname include:

 Pierre de la Broce (died 1278), French councilor to Phillip III
 Jean de Brosse (1375–1433), Marshal of France
 Jean II de Brosse (1432–1482), chamberlain to the King of France
 Claudine de Brosse (1450–1513), French noble
 Jacques de la Brosse (c. 1485–1562), French soldier and diplomat, cupbearer to Francis I
 Jean III de Brosse (died 1502), French noble
 René de Brosse (died 1525), French noble and soldier
 Jean IV de Brosse (1505–1564), French noble
 Salomon de Brosse (1571–1626), French architect
 Guy de La Brosse (1586–1641), French botanist, doctor, and pharmacist
 Joseph de la Brosse (1636–1697), known as Ange de Saint Joseph
 Charles de Brosses (1709–1777), French noble and writer
 Simon de La Brosse (1965–1998), French actor
 Joasil Déméus Débrosse (1968–2013), Haitian journalist
 Laurent Debrosse (born 1969), French footballer

See also
Brosse
La Brosse 
Labrosse (disambiguation)
Bross
La Brosse-Montceaux, a commune in the Seine-et-Marne department in France

Surnames of French origin